Kolbeinn Birgir Finnsson (born 25 August 1999) is an Icelandic professional footballer who plays for Danish club Lyngby and the Iceland national team as a defender and midfielder. He has played domestic football in Iceland, the Netherlands, England, Germany and Denmark.

A product of the Fylkir academy, Kolbeinn began his senior career with the club and transferred to FC Groningen in 2015, with whom he progressed into the reserve team. In 2018, he transferred to Brentford B, from whom he transferred to Borussia Dortmund II in 2019. He was capped by Iceland at youth level and made his full international debut in 2019.

Club career

Fylkir 
A midfielder, Kolbeinn began his career in his native Iceland in the Fylkir academy. His progression was such that he became the club's youngest-ever player when he made his debut at age 14 years and 229 days in a 3–0 group stage League Cup victory over Þróttur on 11 April 2014. Kolbeinn signed a new two and a half year contract on 2 May 2015, he became the youngest player in the club's history to start a Úrvalsdeild match, when he made a late substitute appearance in a 1–1 draw with Fjölnir. Kolbeinn made 15 appearances during the 2015 season and departed the Fylkisvöllur in January 2016.

FC Groningen 
On 27 October 2015, Kolbeinn moved to the Netherlands to join Eredivisie club FC Groningen on a -year contract, effective 1 January 2016. The transfer made him the youngest player to sign a contract with the club. He began his time with the club in the U17 and U19 teams, before progressing into the U23 team, for whom he made 24 Derde Divisie appearances during the 2016–17 and 2017–18 seasons. Kolbeinn was released when his contract expired at the end of the 2017–18 season.

Brentford 
On 8 June 2018, Kolbeinn moved to England to transfer to the B team at Championship club Brentford. He signed a two-year contract, with the option for a further year, effective 1 July 2018. After making his international debut for Iceland in January 2019, Kolbeinn became Brentford B's first ever player to win an international cap without having yet made a first-team appearance for the club. On 17 February 2019, he won his only first team call up for an FA Cup fifth round match versus Swansea City and remained an unused substitute during the 4–1 defeat. Kolbeinn finished the B team season with 43 appearances and 9 goals and returned to Úrvalsdeild club Fylkir on a two-month loan, which was subsequently extended by a further month. He made 15 appearances and scored two goals during his spell. After returning to Griffin Park and playing with the B team in Denmark in early August, he departed the club.

Borussia Dortmund II 
On 20 August 2019, Kolbeinn moved to Germany to transfer to the reserve team at Borussia Dortmund on a three-year contract for an undisclosed fee. After making 18 appearances during the truncated 2019–20 season, he made 28 appearances and scored four goals during the team's Regionalliga West championship-winning 2020–21 season. During an injury-affected 2021–22 3. Liga season, Kolbeinn made 19 appearances without scoring. Entering the final months of his contract, Kolbeinn signed a one-year extension in March 2022. Over the course of his time with the club, Kolbeinn was developed into a left-sided utility player. Following 78 appearances and four goals, Kolbeinn departed the club in January 2023.

Lyngby 
On 25 January 2023, Kolbeinn transferred to Danish Superliga club Lyngby and signed a -year contract.

International career 
Kolbeinn was capped by Iceland at U16, U17, U19 and U21 level and has been capped at senior level. He was a part of the U16 squad which won the bronze medal at the 2014 Summer Youth Olympics. Kolbeinn was included in the squad for the 2021 UEFA European U21 Championship finals and prior to the team's group stage exit, he made three appearances.

Kolbeinn received his maiden call into the senior squad in January 2019 and made his debut as a substitute for Guðmundur Þórarinsson after 78 minutes of a 2–2 friendly draw versus Sweden.

Personal life 
Kolbeinn is the son of retired international footballer Finnur Kolbeinsson.

Career statistics

Club

International

Honours 
Brentford B

 Middlesex Senior Cup: 2018–19
Borussia Dortmund II

 Regionalliga West: 2020–21

Iceland U16

 2014 Summer Youth Olympics: Bronze

Individual

 Saint-Joseph International Tournament Player of the Tournament: 2017

References

External links 

 Kolbeinn Finnsson at voetbalzone.nl
 Kolbeinn Finnsson at olympic.org
 
 

Kolbeinn Finnsson at lyngby-boldklub.dk

1999 births
Living people
Kolbeinn Finnsson
Brentford F.C. players
Association football midfielders
Kolbeinn Finnsson
Kolbeinn Finnsson
FC Groningen players
Kolbeinn Finnsson
Kolbeinn Finnsson
Kolbeinn Finnsson
Expatriate footballers in England
Kolbeinn Finnsson
Expatriate footballers in the Netherlands
Kolbeinn Finnsson
Derde Divisie players
Kolbeinn Finnsson
Borussia Dortmund II players
Kolbeinn Finnsson
Regionalliga players
Footballers at the 2014 Summer Youth Olympics
3. Liga players
Sportspeople from Reykjavík
Association football defenders
Association football fullbacks
Icelandic expatriate sportspeople in Denmark
Expatriate footballers in Denmark
Lyngby Boldklub players
Danish Superliga players